= 1990 Liechtenstein tax referendum =

- 21 October 1990
- Referendum on national communal taxes

Results
Choice	Votes	%
Yes	2,254	24.04%
No	7,121	75.96%
Valid votes	9,375	97.52%
Invalid or blank votes	238	2.48%
Total votes	9,613	100.00%
Registered voters/turnout	13,642	70.47%

A referendum on modification of the legislation on national communal taxes was held in Liechtenstein on 21 October 1990. The proposal was rejected by 76.0% of voters.

== Results ==
Choice	Votes	%
For	2,254	24.0
Against	7,121	76.0
Invalid/blank votes	238	–
Total	9,613	100
Registered voters/turnout	13,642	70.5
Source: Nohlen & Stöver
